Moellendorffia is a gastropod mollusc genus of the family Camaenidae. Members of this genus appear only in East Asia, spanning north from Japan, Mainland China, Hong Kong, Vietnam and Indonesia.

Species
Documented species belonging to Moellendorffia are listed below:
 Moellendorffia blaisei Dautzenberg & Fischer, 1905
 Moellendorffia dengi H.-F. Yang, Z.-Y. Fan, D.-D. Qiao & J. He, 2012
 Moellendorffia depressispira (Bavay & Dautzenberg, 1909)
Moellendorffia diminuta
 Moellendorffia eastlakeana (Möllendorff, 1882)
 Moellendorffia hensaniensis (Gredler, 1885)
 Moellendorffia loxotata (Mabille, 1887)
 Moellendorffia messageri (Bavay & Dautzenberg, 1899)
Moellendorffia sculptilis (Moellendorff, 1884)
 Moellendorffia spurca (Bavay & Dautzenberg, 1899)
Moellendorffia tokunoensis
Moellendorffia trisinuata (Martens, 1867)
Moellendorffia trisinuata sculptilis (Moellendorff, 1881)
Moellendorffia trisinuata trisinuata (Moellendorff, 1867)
Taxon inquirendum
 † Moellendorffia polygyrella Yü, 1982 
Species brought into synonymy
 Moellendorffia callitrichia (Bavay & Dautzenberg, 1899): synonym of Moellendorffia eastlakeana (Möllendorff, 1882) (junior synonym)
 Moellendorffia erdmanni (Schmacker & O. Boettger, 1894): synonym of Moellendorffiella erdmanni (Schmacker & O. Boettger, 1894) (unaccepted combination)
 Moellendorffia eucharistus (Pilsbry, 1905): synonym of Trichelix eucharistus (Pilsbry, 1901): synonym of Trichelix eucharista (Pilsbry, 1901)
 Moellendorffia faberiana (Möllendorff, 1888): synonym of Moellendorffiella faberiana (Möllendorff, 1888) (superseded combination)
 Moellendorffia hiraseana Pilsbry, 1905: synonym of Trichelix hiraseana' (Pilsbry, 1905) (original combination)
 Moellendorffia horrida (L. Pfeiffer, 1863): synonym of Trichelix horrida'' (L. Pfeiffer, 1863) (unaccepted combination)

References

External links
 

Moellendorffia